Konstantinos Argiros  is a Greek singer, born 21 May 1986, in Athens.

Biography
Konstantinos Argiros, originally from Lefkada, grew up with his family in Athens, Greece. He is one of three siblings (triplets). At the age of five, he took his first steps in music, learning to play the piano. Later on, he learned to play the guitar and some other Greek musical instruments. He began to work professionally as a  singer, appearing at "FIX" nightclub in Thessaloniki. In the summer of 2008 he collaborated with record company Sony Bmg, and released an album. Between September 2011 and May 2012 he appeared at "VOX" alongside singer Stella Kali.

He sings at Teatro Music Hall in Athens, every Friday and Saturday.

Discography 

2011: Mallon Kati Xero
2012: Paidi Gennaio
2014: Defteri Fora
2016: Osa Niotho
2018: Filise Me
2018: To Kati Parapano
2022: 22

Awards 
MAD Video Music Award for Ποτέ Ξανά (Pote xana) (2013, won)
MAD Video Music Award for Ξημερώματα (Ximeromata) (2018, won)

References 

MAD Video Music Awards (2013) - Best Song for "Ποτέ Ξανά""

MAD Video Music Awards (2016) - BEST VIDEO MAD GREEKZ for the song "Το συμπέρασμα"

MAD Music Cyprus (2016) - Male Artist of the Year

Super Music Awards (2016) - Artist with the biggest Airplay Chart "Το συμπέρασμα"

Super Music Awards (2017) - Best Folk Singer

Super Music Awards (2018) - Favorite song of the year by SUPERFM producers

Mad Video Music Awards (2018) - Best folk singer and song of the year (ξημερώματα)

MAD Video Music Awards (2019) - Best Male Adult

MAD Video Music Awards (2020) - Best Male Adult

MAD Video Music Awards (2021) - Best Male Adult

Best Video-Laiko (2021) - Konstantinos Argyros - Αθήνα Μου

Living people
21st-century Greek male singers
1986 births